A tautochrone or isochrone curve (from Greek prefixes tauto- meaning same or iso- equal, and chrono time) is the curve for which the time taken by an object sliding without friction in uniform gravity to its lowest point is independent of its starting point on the curve.  The curve is a cycloid, and the time is equal to π times the square root of the radius (of the circle which generates the cycloid) over the acceleration of gravity.  The tautochrone curve is related to the brachistochrone curve, which is also a cycloid.

The tautochrone problem 

The tautochrone problem, the attempt to identify this curve, was solved by Christiaan Huygens in 1659. He proved geometrically in his Horologium Oscillatorium, originally published in 1673, that the curve is a cycloid.

The cycloid is given by a point on a circle of radius  tracing a curve as the circle rolls along the  axis, as:

This solution was later used to solve the problem of the brachistochrone curve.  Johann Bernoulli solved the problem in a paper (Acta Eruditorum, 1697).

The tautochrone problem was studied by Huygens more closely when it was realized that a pendulum, which follows a circular path, was not isochronous and thus his pendulum clock would keep different time depending on how far the pendulum swung. After determining the correct path, Christiaan Huygens attempted to create pendulum clocks that used a string to suspend the bob and curb cheeks near the top of the string to change the path to the tautochrone curve. These attempts proved unhelpful for a number of reasons. First, the bending of the string causes friction, changing the timing. Second, there were much more significant sources of timing errors that overwhelmed any theoretical improvements that traveling on the tautochrone curve helps. Finally, the "circular error" of a pendulum decreases as length of the swing decreases, so better clock escapements could greatly reduce this source of inaccuracy.

Later, the mathematicians Joseph Louis Lagrange and Leonhard Euler provided an analytical solution to the problem.

Lagrangian solution 
If the particle's position is parametrized by the arclength  from the lowest point, the kinetic energy is proportional to  The potential energy is proportional to the height . One way the curve can be an isochrone is if the Lagrangian is that of a simple harmonic oscillator: the height of the curve must be proportional to the arclength squared.

where the constant of proportionality has been set to 1 by changing units of length.

The differential form of this relation is

where . This integral is the area under a circle, which can be naturally cut into a triangle and a circular wedge:

To see that this is a strangely parametrized cycloid, change variables to disentangle the transcendental and algebraic parts by defining the angle . This yields

"Virtual gravity" solution 
The simplest solution to the tautochrone problem is to note a direct relation between the angle of an incline and the gravity felt by a particle on the incline. A particle on a 90° vertical incline undergoes full gravitational acceleration , while a particle on a horizontal plane undergoes zero gravitational acceleration. Note that  is measured between the tangent to the curve and the horizontal, with angles above the horizontal being treated as positive angles.

The position of a mass measured along a tautochrone curve, must obey the following differential equation:

It can be easily verified both that this solution solves the differential equation and that a particle will reach  at time  from any starting position .  The problem is now to construct a curve that will cause the mass to obey the above motion. Newton's second law shows that the force of gravity and the acceleration of the mass are related by:

The explicit appearance of the distance, is troublesome, but we can differentiate to obtain a more manageable form:

This equation relates the change in the curve's angle to the change in the distance along the curve.  We now use trigonometry to relate the angle  to the differential lengths ,  and :

It is typical to set  and  so that the lowest point on the curve coincides with the origin. Therefore:

(Based loosely on Proctor, pp. 135–139)

Abel's solution 
Niels Henrik Abel attacked a generalized version of the tautochrone problem (Abel's mechanical problem), namely, given a function  that specifies the total time of descent for a given starting height, find an equation of the curve that yields this result. The tautochrone problem is a special case of Abel's mechanical problem when  is a constant.

Abel's solution begins with the principle of conservation of energy – since the particle is frictionless, and thus loses no energy to heat, its kinetic energy at any point is exactly equal to the difference in gravitational potential energy from its starting point.

In the last equation, we have anticipated writing the distance remaining along the curve as a function of height (recognized that the distance remaining must decrease as time increases (thus the minus sign), and used the chain rule in the form .

This is called Abel's integral equation and allows us to compute the total time required for a particle to fall along a given curve (for which  would be easy to calculate). But Abel's mechanical problem requires the converse – given , we wish to find , from which an equation for the curve would follow in a straightforward manner.

where .

This is as far as we can go without specifying .

For the tautochrone problem,  is constant.

Making use again of the Laplace transform above, we invert the transform and conclude:

It can be shown that the cycloid obeys this equation.

(Simmons, Section 54).

See also 
 Beltrami identity
 Brachistochrone curve
 Calculus of variations
 Catenary
 Cycloid
 Uniformly accelerated motion

References

Bibliography

External links 
 Mathworld

Plane curves
Mechanics

de:Zykloide#Die Tautochronie der Zykloide